Khosla Ventures is an American venture capital firm founded by Vinod Khosla, focused on early-stage companies in the Internet, computing, mobile, financial services, agriculture, healthcare and clean technology sectors. Some of its most successful investments include Affirm, DoorDash, Square, Impossible Foods and Instacart.

History
The firm was founded in 2004 by Vinod Khosla, a former general partner of Kleiner Perkins. The firm's first two investment vehicles were funded with Khosla's own personal capital and were not open to institutional investors. In March 2009, Pierre Lamond became General Partner. In December 2009, Khosla completed fundraising for two new funds, to invest in cleantech and information technology start-ups.

Khosla Ventures Fund III secured $1 billion of investor commitments to invest in traditional early stage and growth stage companies.  Khosla also raised $300 million for Khosla Seed, which will invest in higher-risk opportunities and science experiments. The firm has invested in bio-refineries for energy and bioplastics, solar, wind, battery, engines, LED, HVAC efficiency and other environmentally friendly technologies.

In September 2017, Khosla Ventures had about $5 billion in assets under management.

In October 2021, Khosla Ventures announced that it had raised $1.4 billion in funding to invest in early-to-late stage startups, breaking down to $400 million for seed deals and $1 billion for later-stage companies. The fund has incubated several companies including QuantumScape and NextVivo.

In January 2022, Khosla Ventures raised $557 million in its first opportunity fund.

Investments
Khosla Ventures has invested in several enterprise companies including Okta, valued at $27 billion as of August 2020, RingCentral, valued at $23.5 billion as of May 2021, along with others including Nutanix, ThoughtSpot and Rubrik. Khosla investments into transportation include Hermeus, Waabi, and Glydways.

In October 2021, DevOps platform provider GitLab raised $801 million in its initial public offering. Khosla Ventures led the seed round in 2015 and reportedly made more than 150 times return on its investment.

Khosla Ventures has also made numerous healthcare investments including Guardant Health. Many of Khosla's healthcare investments are based on his belief that artificial intelligence will allow for safer and cheaper healthcare. The companies include Color Genomics, a genetic testing service, Oscar Health, a tech enabled health insurance, Sword Health, which provides virtual MSK care, and Cellino which is known for its drug discovery. Khosla Ventures was the first venture capital investor of Impossible Foods, investing $3 million in 2011.

Affirm, a financial technology company, raised $1.2 billion in its initial public offering, which was the largest U.S. filing of the year to date. The firm was its first venture capital investor. In October 2021, Khosla Ventures announced that it had raised $1.4 billion in funding to invest in early-to-late stage startups breaking down to $400 million for seed deals and $1 billion for later-stage companies.

Notable investments include Academia.edu, Berkshire Grey, DoorDash, Faire, Hermeus, Impossible Foods, Instacart, Opendoor, Square, Stripe, Vectra Networks Inc. and Velo3d.

Programs and partnerships
In February 2021, Khosla Ventures filed plans for the public offerings of three special-purpose acquisition companies (SPAC), which intend to raise a total of $1.2 billion for the purpose of acquiring and taking public three private companies. Through a Khosla-backed SPAC, Nextdoor began trading under the ticker KIND in November 2021 with a $4.3 billion valuation. The company was valued at $2.2 billion in 2019.

References

Khosla Ventures Goes Retro for New Blood.  New York Times, March 3, 2009
Venture capital firm embraces green technology.  New York Times: Spotlight

External links

Company website

Venture capital firms of the United States
American companies established in 2004
Companies based in Menlo Park, California
Financial services companies established in 2004